Sons of Liberty is a computer wargame published by Strategic Simulations in 1987 for the Apple II, Atari 8-bit family, Commodore 64, and DOS.

Gameplay
Sons of Liberty is a game in which American Revolutionary War scenarios include Bunker Hill, Monmouth, and Saratoga.

Reception
Wyatt Lee reviewed the game for Computer Gaming World, and stated that "In summary, one must note that each release in the "American Civil War" series showed refinements over the previous game. SOL is no exception."

Reviews
The Games Machine - Jul, 1988
Computer Gaming World - Oct, 1990
Computer Play

References

External links
Review in Compute!
Review in ANALOG Computing
Article in Atari Interface
Review in Current Notes
Article in Computer Play
Review in Commodore Disk User
Review in RUN Magazine

1987 video games
Apple II games
Atari 8-bit family games
Commodore 64 games
Computer wargames
DOS games
Strategic Simulations games
Turn-based strategy video games
Video games about the American Revolution
Video games developed in the United States
Video games set in Massachusetts
Video games set in New Jersey
Video games set in New York (state)